USS Tinosa has been the name of more than one United States Navy ship, and may refer to:

 , a submarine in commission from 1943 to 1949 and from 1952 to 1953
 , a submarine in commission from 1964 to 1992

United States Navy ship names